The May Company Ohio was a chain of department stores that was based in Cleveland, Ohio, United States.

History
In 1899, David May, the founder of May Department Stores, acquired E. R. Hull & Dutton Co. of Cleveland on Ontario Street, renaming it May Company, Cleveland.  In 1914 May added an additional landmark building on Euclid Avenue, fronting on the southeast corner of Public Square. The high-rise building stands 149 feet and contains 8 floors of space, though floors 7 and 8 were not added until 1931.

In 1939 May Co. acquired majority control of another Cleveland store, William Taylor Son & Co., which maintained a separate identity until 1961.  Expansion to the suburbs began in the 1950s, with Sheffield Shopping Center, Lorain in 1953 (originally opened as an O'Neil's store which was a May Company subsidiary and then changed over to a May Company location in 1967) and Cedar-Center Plaza at Cedar and Warrensville Roads in University Heights in late 1956 (known locally as "May's on the Heights"). In 1960 a branch was opened at Parmatown Mall in Parma, and another in 1961 at Southgate Shopping Center in Maple Heights (the Southgate store having been originally opened in 1958 by William Taylor & Son Co.).  Several mall stores followed in the 1960s and 1970s, including Great Lakes Mall (1964) Great Northern Mall (Ohio) in North Olmsted (1965), Randall Park Mall in North Randall (1976), Euclid Square Mall in Euclid (1977) and Sandusky Mall in Sandusky (1979).

The company also constructed a nine-story warehouse (six stories tall, with three sub basements) attached to the south side of the Cedar Center Store, designed to handle furniture distribution for Cleveland's eastside.  The red brick facility, designed to look like an integrated part of the colossal four story store was used for a short time, but remained empty from 1960 until the University Heights store was demolished and re-built in 2002 by this time it was re-branded as Kaufmann's.

The May Company specialized in mid to higher end fashion merchandise and home furnishings, but target price points placed May Company merchandise at, or below its two major competitors in the Cleveland market Higbee's and Halle's. May Company was the first local department store to issue its own personal charge card, announcing it on July 16, 1966 in a Cleveland Plain Dealer article, breaking away from being part of the Department Stores Charge Plate (a metal card that was notched for each store and used at all participating members which included William Taylor Son & Co., Bailey's, Sterling-Lindner-Davis, The Higbee Company and The Halle Bros. Co.) Higbee's and Halle's continued to remain part of this system until they each issued their own individual plastic charge cards respectively in 1969.

In addition to its merchandise, the company was known for its sponsorship of the Eagle Stamp program. Consumers could earn Eagle Stamps on purchases at The May Company as well as on purchases at Pick-N-Pay Supermarkets, Leader Drug Stores, and participating gas stations and dry cleaners.  Completed stamp booklets could be redeemed at May Company for $3 credits toward merchandise purchases at May Company stores. The trading stamp program was administered by the May Company owned Eagle Stamp Company of St. Louis from 1903 to 1987.

In 1989 May Company, Cleveland and O'Neil's, based in Akron were merged to form May Company Ohio, as the May Department Stores began consolidating its regional department store divisions.  On January 31, 1993 May Company, Ohio was merged into Kaufmann's of Pittsburgh, Pennsylvania, and its Downtown Cleveland store was closed.  Many of its former locations became Macy's in 2006.

May Company Cleveland building
May's Cleveland headquarters building was listed on the National Register of Historic Places in 1974.

In late 2013, it was announced that the May Co building was set to potentially house over 350 apartments.

Bedrock-Detroit, a real estate company co-founded by Dan Gilbert, bought the May Company Building on Public Square in 2017 for $12 million and now has plans to convert it to 308 apartments, almost 600 interior parking spaces, retail stores and rooftops for entertainment and green areas for residents' use. The opening date for the $140M renovation was expected to be in June 2020, but construction has been delayed due to the COVID-19 pandemic.

References

History of Cleveland
National Register of Historic Places in Cleveland, Ohio
Defunct department stores based in Cleveland
Commercial buildings on the National Register of Historic Places in Ohio
Commercial buildings completed in 1914
Department stores on the National Register of Historic Places
Defunct companies based in Cleveland
Residential skyscrapers in Cleveland
Retail companies established in 1898
Retail companies disestablished in 1993
1898 establishments in Ohio
Chicago school architecture in Ohio